Insects are six-legged arthropods of the class Insecta.

Insect or Insects may also refer to:

 Insects (album) by the band Breed 77, or the title track
 Insects (film), 2018 Czech animated film 
 Insects (journal), scientific periodical on entomology
 Insect-class gunboat
 "Insects", a 2010 song by Ash from their A–Z Series

See also
Insectia, nature program
Insectoid (disambiguation)
Bug (disambiguation)